Magdalena Solís (1947 – date of death unknown), known as The High Priestess of Blood, was a Mexican serial killer and cult leader responsible for orchestrating several murders which involved the drinking of the victims' blood. The murders were committed in Yerba Buena, San Luis Potosí, during the early 1960s.

Solís was convicted of two of the murders and sentenced to 50 years in prison; authorities ascribed eight murders to Solís and suspected she was involved in as many as 15. She is regarded as one of the few documented instances of a sexually-motivated female serial killer, showing organized, visionary, and hedonistic characteristics.

Psychiatric profile
Magdalena Solís came from a poor and most likely dysfunctional, family in Tamaulipas, where she was supposedly born in 1947. She is believed to have been working as a prostitute since an early age under her brother, a local pimp named Eleazar, before joining the Hernández Brothers' sect in 1963. After this, Solís developed a serious theological psychosis, causing her to experience major religiously-oriented delusions of grandeur, coupled with a myriad of sexual perversions expressed in consuming the blood of her victims, sadomasochistic tendencies, fetishistic practices and pedophilia.

The Hernández Brothers' sect
In late 1962 or early 1963, brothers and petty scammers Santos and Cayetano Hernández, devised a ploy to help them acquire wealth quick. They travelled to the isolated community of Yerba Buena, an impoverished and mostly illiterate village of about 50 inhabitants, to whom they proclaimed themselves as prophets and high priests of "the powerful and exiled Inca gods". They proclaimed that "the Inca gods, in exchange for worship and tributes, would grant them hidden treasures in the caves of the mountains surrounding the town (a place where they also performed their rites); and that they would soon come to claim authority over their ancient kingdom, and punish the non-believers."

Despite the brothers' ignorance of both Inca mythology and pre-Hispanic history, which shows that the Incas inhabited Peru and not Mexico, they managed to convince the inhabitants of Yerba Buena of their absurdities. The Hernándezes then founded a relatively large sect, demanding economic and sexual tributes from adult members (both male and female); ingesting drugs during orgies and even selling some of their subordinates into sexual slavery.

The cult was run without issues for some time, but at one point the believers began to grow skeptical when the "high priests" failed to have their promises fulfilled. To remedy this, the Hernándezes went to Monterrey in search of prostitutes who wanted in on the farce, eventually coming into contact with Magdalena and her brother, who agreed to participate. In a later ritual, Solís was presented as the reincarnation of the goddess Cōātlīcue through a flashy smoke screen trick, which convinced the sect's followers of her authenticity. Perhaps to the two brothers' detriment, Solís eventually came to believe that she truly was a reincarnated goddess, and took command of the entire cult.

Crimes
By the time Solís took control, two of her followers, fed up with the sexual abuse, expressed their desire to leave. Fearing the repercussions, other members informed Solís and the Hernández brothers of this, with the former decreeing that the "heretics" be sacrificed. In response, the two unfortunates were lynched by fellow members.

Blood ritual
After these first two murders, Solís' crimes gradually escalated in violence and brutality. As she was bored with simple orgies, she began to demand human sacrifices and devised a "blood ritual": the sacrificed (who was always a dissenting member) was brutally beaten, burned, cut and mutilated by all members of the cult, before being left to bleed to death. The blood was then deposited in a chalice mixed with chicken blood and narcotics (mostly marijuana or peyotes), from which Solís drank, before passing it along to the brothers and finally to other members. This supposedly gave them supernatural abilities, and at the end of the ritual, the victim's heart was ripped out.

Basing their beliefs of Aztec mythology, Solís and the Hernández brothers proclaimed that blood is the only food the gods can ingest, and that their goddess needed to drink it to preserve her eternal youth. The carnage lasted six continuous weeks, during which 4 people died and had their hearts extracted post-mortem.

Last victims
One night in May 1963, a 14-year-old local, Sebastián Guerrero, was wandering around the caves where the sect was performing their rites. Drawn by the lights and noises coming from one of the caves, he went to investigate; to his horror, he watched as the cult was in the process of killing yet another victim. Terrified, he ran for more than 25 kilometers to the town of Villa Gran, where the nearest police station was located. Exhausted and in a state of shock, Guerrero failed to give any other description than seeing a "group of murderers, seized by ecstasy, gathered to drink human blood".

His claims were met with ridicule by the officers, who took them as the delusions of a mentally-ill or drugged boy. On the following morning, one investigator, Luis Martínez, offered an escort home for Guerrero, as well as to check where he had seen the "vampires". After their departure, Martínez never returned to work.

Apprehension and conviction
Dismayed by the disappearance of both Guerrero and their colleague, the police started to take the case seriously, and contacted the army for assistance. On May 31, 1963, both police officers and soldiers conducted a joint crackdown in Yerba Buena, arresting Magdalena and Eleazar Solís at a farm in the town, where they were under the influence of marijuana. Santos Hernández would later be killed while resisting arrest, while his brother, Cayetano, had already been killed by a delusional cult member, Jesús Rubio, who later claimed that he had wanted to take a part of the high priest's body to protect himself. Many of the cult members, who had barricaded themselves inside the cave, were killed in shootouts as well.

In subsequent investigations, the dismembered corpses of Sebastián Guerrero and Luis Martínez were found near the farm where the Solís siblings were residing, with Martínez's heart having been removed. In later searches, investigators found the mutilated corpses of six more people while examining the caves. For these two killings, both Magdalena and Eleazar were sentenced to 50 years imprisonment. Their guilt couldn't be proven in the other murders, since the surviving cult members refused to testify against them. As for the rest of the cult members, taking into account mitigating factors such as their illiteracy and impoverished circumstances, each was given a 30-year prison term. Years later, some of the former members began giving interviews about the horrors they had experienced while in the sect.

In popular culture
 A Belgian rock band named itself after Magdalena Solís.

See also
List of serial killers by country

Bibliography

References

1947 births
Crimes involving Satanism or the occult
Cult leaders
Mexican female murderers
Mexican female serial killers
Mexican people convicted of murder
Mexican rapists
People convicted of murder by Mexico
People from Tamaulipas
Satanists
Vampirism (crime)